Great Dog or Canis Major is a constellation.

Great Dog may also refer to:
Great Dog Island, an island in the British Virgin Islands
Great Dog Island (Tasmania)